DNQX (6,7-dinitroquinoxaline-2,3-dione) is a competitive antagonist at AMPA and kainate receptors, two ionotropic glutamate receptor (iGluR) subfamilies. It is used in a variety of molecular biology subfields, notably neurophysiology, to assist researchers in determining the properties of various types of ion channels and their potential applications in medicine.

See also 
 Quinoxalinedione
 CNQX

References

External links 
 DNQX MSDS

AMPA receptor antagonists
Kainate receptor antagonists
NMDA receptor antagonists
Nitro compounds
Quinoxalines
Quinones
Lactams